David Morgan Moffat (born 22 January 1943) is a Scottish-born New Zealand lawn and indoor bowler, who has won medals representing both Scotland and New Zealand at the Commonwealth Games.

Bowls career
Moffat was born in Scotland and won a bronze medal in the 1974 Commonwealth Games in Christchurch before emigrating the following year to New Zealand. He won another bronze in both the triples and fours in the 1980 World Outdoor Bowls Championship, but this time for New Zealand. The success continued as he won bronze in the triples and silver in the fours during the 1984 World Outdoor Bowls Championship. Moffat also secured a fours silver in Edmonton during the 1978 Commonwealth Games and a fours silver in the 1982 Commonwealth Games. 

A gold medal finally came in 1988 when he won the triples at the 1988 World Outdoor Bowls Championship in Auckland.

He won the 1978 fours title at the New Zealand National Bowls Championships when bowling for the Linwood Bowls Club.

Awards
In 2013, Moffat was an inaugural inductee into the Bowls New Zealand Hall of Fame.

References

 Profile at the New Zealand Olympic Committee website

1943 births
Living people
Scottish male bowls players
Scottish emigrants to New Zealand
New Zealand male bowls players
Place of birth missing (living people)
Commonwealth Games bronze medallists for Scotland
Commonwealth Games silver medallists for New Zealand
Bowls players at the 1974 British Commonwealth Games
Bowls players at the 1978 Commonwealth Games
Bowls players at the 1982 Commonwealth Games
Commonwealth Games medallists in lawn bowls
Bowls World Champions
Medallists at the 1974 British Commonwealth Games
Medallists at the 1978 Commonwealth Games
Medallists at the 1982 Commonwealth Games